Doguwa is a Local Government Area in the extreme south of Kano State, Nigeria. Its headquarters are in the town of Riruwai.

It has an area of 1,473 km and a population of 151,181 at the 2006 census.

The postal code of the area is 710.

References

Local Government Areas in Kano State